Dabbl was a user-controlled radio station broadcast on the Internet and on DAB Digital Radio in Cardiff 24 hours a day and in London from 7pm to 6am daily. Its content was chosen by members of Absolute Radio's website VIP Service, who select songs which are then voted for. Songs with the most votes are then broadcast.  It operated from October 1, 2009 until August 25, 2010.

CTRL
Dabbl first appeared on DAB in London under the name "CTRL", however this was just broadcasting the "Absolute Radio" launch clock sound.

Availability
The station was previously available on the multiplexes in London on the Switch multiplex between 7 pm and 6 am, and in Cardiff and online 24 hours a day.  In Bristol & Bath, Southend & Chelmsford, Swindon, Reading & Basingstoke, it was replaced by the more popular Absolute 90s in June 2010.

References

 
Defunct radio stations in the United Kingdom
Radio stations established in 2009
Radio stations disestablished in 2010

de:Virgin Radio Xtreme